Basketball Agia Paraskevi ( - Kalathosfairisi Agia Paraskevi), officially abbreviated as K.A.P. (Κ.Α.Π.), is a Greek basketball club that is based in Agia Paraskevi, Athens. It was founded in 1986, and so far it has twice played in the Greek 2nd Division. 

The club currently plays in the Greek 4th Division.

History
Agia Paraskevi was founded in 1986, with the merger of two of the local clubs of Agia Paraskevi, Keravnos and Pegasus. It was originally named O.F.K. Agia Paraskevi (Omilos Filon Kalathosfairisis Agias Paraskevis), but in 2001, it was renamed to its current name. In 2012, the club earned a league promotion up to the Greek 2nd Division, for first time in its history. 

However, it only remained in the Greek 2nd Division for two years, and in 2014, it was relegated down again to the Greek 3rd Division. In the 2014–15 season, Agia Paraskevi finished in 11th place in the Greek 3rd Division, was again relegated down to the Greek 4th Division.

Recent seasons

Notable players

 Makis Nikolaidis

Head coaches
 Kostas Keramidas

See also
GS Agia Paraskevi
Agia Paraskevi F.C.

References

External links
Official site 
Eurobasket.com team Profile

Basketball teams in Athens